The 2010 Bragging Rights was the second annual and final Bragging Rights professional wrestling pay-per-view (PPV) event produced by World Wrestling Entertainment (WWE). It was held for wrestlers from the promotion's Raw and SmackDown brand divisions. The event took place on October 24, 2010, at the Target Center in Minneapolis, Minnesota.

The theme of the event was that wrestlers from the Raw and SmackDown brands competed against each other for "bragging rights." The event was discontinued as the first brand split was dissolved in August 2011. This theme, however, would be reintroduced with the second brand extension in 2016 at that year's Survivor Series, and the annual Survivor Series is now about "brand supremacy."

Seven matches were contested at the event. It received 137,000 buys, down from the 181,000 of the previous year. Bragging Rights was discontinued and replaced by Vengeance in 2011.

Production

Background
In 2009, World Wrestling Entertainment (WWE) held a pay-per-view (PPV) titled Bragging Rights. The concept of the show was based around a series of interpromotional matches for "bragging rights" between wrestlers of the Raw and SmackDown brands, with a Bragging Rights Trophy awarded to the brand that won the most matches out of the series. A second Bragging Rights event was scheduled to be held on October 24, 2010, at the Target Center in Minneapolis, Minnesota.

Storylines
Bragging Rights featured professional wrestling matches involving different wrestlers from pre-existing scripted feuds, plots, and storylines that were played out on World Wrestling Entertainment's (WWE) television programs. Wrestlers portrayed villains or heroes as they followed a series of events that build tension and culminated in a wrestling match or series of matches.

On the October 8 episode of SmackDown, Big Show was named the captain of Team SmackDown. On the October 11 episode of Raw, six of the seven members of Team Raw qualified through winning matches, all of which included John Morrison, R-Truth, Santino Marella, Sheamus, the recently traded CM Punk and the team captain The Miz. Following that, SmackDown also held qualification matches adding Rey Mysterio, Jack Swagger, Alberto Del Rio, Kofi Kingston, and the recently traded Edge. Hoping to prove himself, Kaval challenged the Big Show to earn a spot on Team SmackDown, Big Show stated that Kaval wouldn't last five minutes in the ring with him and accepted a five-minute challenge. Kaval lasted the five minutes and earned a spot on Team SmackDown only to lose to Tyler Reks right after and lose his spot to him. On the October 18 episode of Raw, The Miz completed Team Raw by adding the returning Ezekiel Jackson as the seventh member of Team Raw.

The main rivalry from Raw involved the WWE Champion Randy Orton against Nexus leader Wade Barrett in a match for Orton's WWE Championship which included newly inducted Nexus member John Cena in Barrett's corner. The previous month at the Hell in a Cell pay-per-view, John Cena lost a match to Wade Barrett, due to interference by Husky Harris and Michael McGillicutty, under the stipulation that Cena would join the Nexus upon losing. While attempting to destroy the Nexus from the inside, the Raw General Manager forced Cena to follow Barrett's orders because of the stipulations of the match or he would fire Cena. During a Battle Royal to determine the next number one contender to face Randy Orton, Cena, Barrett and the other members of the Nexus worked together to eliminate the other Raw Superstars, until only Cena and Barrett were left, Barrett ultimately won when he forced Cena to eliminate himself, thus making Barrett the number one contender. Upon winning, Barrett forced Cena to be in his corner during the match to ensure that Barrett wins the match.

Another rivalry from Raw was that of Dolph Ziggler and Daniel Bryan. On the October 18 episode of Raw, Bryan challenged Ziggler to an interpromotional match at Bragging Rights. Ziggler accepted the challenge and the match was made official. It was announced that the match would be non-title, with Ziggler being the Intercontinental Champion and Bryan being the United States Champion.

The main rivalry from SmackDown involved the World Heavyweight Champion Kane against his (kayfabe) half-brother The Undertaker in a Buried Alive match for the World Heavyweight Championship. At Hell in a Cell, Paul Bearer, who was with The Undertaker during the Hell in a Cell match against Kane, betrayed The Undertaker giving the victory to Kane once again. Two weeks later on SmackDown, Paul Bearer issued one more challenge to The Undertaker in a Buried Alive match. Later that night, The Undertaker accepted the  match and taunted Kane with his own pyrotechnics.

Another rivalry from SmackDown revolved around the Divas Championship. Michelle McCool and Layla were the self professed "Co-Divas Champions" heading into the event, where one of them would face challenger Natalya. It was announced on the October 22 episode of SmackDown that Layla would be the one to face Natalya at Bragging Rights, with the Divas Championship on the line.

Event

Prior to Bragging Rights airing, an untelevised match took place between Montel Vontavious Porter and Chavo Guerrero Jr., which Porter won.

Preliminary matches
The first match aired was between Dolph Ziggler and Daniel Bryan in an inter-promotional singles match. Bryan dominated the match early on, before the pair traded control of the match. Following a series of near-falls Ziggler earned a three-count. As Bryan's feet were on the ropes, however, the match continued. The two traded moves and near falls until Bryan forced Ziggler to submit to his LeBell Lock hold (an omoplata crossface).  Immediately after the match ended, Vickie Guerrero entered the ring and started arguing with the referee about Ziggler's loss due to the fact that during the match, he had earned a three count and the referee did not see Bryan's foot on the ropes and decided to continue the match. The referee preceded to symbolically eject Vickie and then Dolph Ziggler as he engaged in the argument with Vickie.

The second contest of the evening was an impromptu tag team match, with the Tag Team Championship on the line. Wade Barrett announced that David Otunga and John Cena were to face champions Cody Rhodes and Drew McIntyre. Otunga and Rhodes started the match, and Rhodes gained control. Rhodes and McIntyre utilised quick tags to keep control and earn a near-fall before Otunga tagged in Cena. Rhodes submitted to Cena's STF hold to end the match, and make Cena and Otunga the new champions. Following the match, Cena attacked Otunga and left with both championship belts.

The third match was also impromptu and had not been advertised prior to the event. Ted DiBiase Jr. and Goldust faced off in a singles match, revolving around Goldust stealing the Million Dollar Championship from DiBiase a few weeks prior to the event. The match ended when Goldust was distracted by Maryse and Aksana fighting outside the ring, and pinned by DiBiase.

The next match was for the Divas Championship between champion Layla and challenger Natalya. Natalya dominated the first part of the match until Layla managed to counter. Michelle McCool, Layla's tag team partner, interfered in the match on multiple occasions, and helped Layla to win the contest by pinfall.

Main event matches
The fifth contest of the evening was the Buried Alive match between Kane and The Undertaker, with Kane's World Heavyweight Championship on the line. The match started with both men brawling on the entrance ramp, at ringside, and into the audience, before they entered the ring. Kane took control after using a steel chair, and dragged The Undertaker out of the ring and up to the burial site, located at the side of the entrance ramp. The Undertaker retakes control by using his Hell's Gate gogoplata submission hold. The Undertaker was distracted by Paul Bearer, and then The Nexus interfered in the match, attacking The Undertaker and beginning to fill the grave with dirt, before Kane scared them off. Kane hit The Undertaker with an urn, causing him to fall into the grave, and then used a digger to fill the grave and win the match. This was Undertaker's last pay-per-view match outside of WrestleMania, until SummerSlam 2015, and ended his status as a full-time wrestler.

The sixth match was the seven-on-seven elimination tag team match between Team Raw and Team SmackDown. Santino Marella was the first eliminated from Team Raw, when he was pinned by Tyler Reks. Sheamus eliminated SmackDown's Kofi Kingston. In the course of the match, Alberto Del Rio attacked his own teammate Rey Mysterio, and Mysterio was escorted to the back by medical personnel. John Morrison eliminated Jack Swagger and Sheamus eliminated Reks giving Team Raw a six-three advantage. Big Show and Sheamus fought outside the ring, which led to both men being counted out. Edge eliminated R-Truth and Morrison in quick succession, but CM Punk eliminated Del Rio, leaving Edge as the only member of Team SmackDown. Mysterio, who was never officially eliminated, returned to the match and rejoined Team SmackDown. Mysterio quickly pinned Punk and Jackson, leaving The Miz as the only wrestler remaining on Team Raw. Alex Riley, The Miz's protege, prevented Mysterio from performing his finishing move on The Miz, but Edge performed a Spear on The Miz. Edge pinned The Miz to win the match for Team SmackDown.

The seventh and final contest of the night was for the WWE Championship between champion Randy Orton and challenger Wade Barrett, who was accompanied by John Cena. The stipulation is if Barrett lose the match Cena would be fired. Orton took initial control of the match, but Barrett was able to gain some control before Cena caused a distraction allowing Orton to regain control. On the outside of the ring, Barrett sent Orton shoulder first into the steel steps, allowing Barrett to take control of the match. The Nexus interfered and attacked Orton while the referee was down, until Cena stopped them, telling Barrett he did it to stop Barrett from being disqualified. Following Orton regaining control, Cena attacked Barrett causing Barrett to win by disqualification. Orton retained the championship, but as Barrett won the match, Cena retained his job. Following the match, Orton attacked both Cena and Barrett to end the event.

Reception
Bragging Rights received 137,000 pay-per-view buys, a decrease from the 181,000 garnered by the 2009 event of the same name; this represented a decline of 24% and contributed to a $2.5 million decline in pay-per-view revenue in the fourth quarter of 2010 for WWE. Overall the event was positively received, with the Bryan vs Ziggler and Team SmackDown vs Team Raw matches being particularly praised.

Aftermath 
After vignettes started airing from January 31 episode of Raw with the date 2-21-11 burned into the screen, The Undertaker returned on the February 21, 2011 episode of Raw. After Undertaker entered the ring, Triple H also returned that night and confronted him, where the two engaged in a non-verbal stare-down before looking at the WrestleMania XXVII sign, signaling a challenge between the two at the event which was later confirmed four days later on WWE's official website. Undertaker defeated Triple H in a No Holds Barred Match at WrestleMania XXVII to extend his undefeated WrestleMania Streak to 19-0 but the beatdown he received during the match had left him to leave the ring on a stretcher.

After defeating The Undertaker. Kane set up a "funeral service" for his half-brother but was interrupted by Rey Mysterio, Alberto Del Rio and Edge who wanted to have a shot at the World Heavyweight Championship. Edge defeated Mysterio and Del Rio in a Triple Threat Match to become the number one contender to face Kane for the World Heavyweight Championship at Survivor Series. The match ended in a draw so Kane retained his title.

The Undertaker and Kane would not appear on screen together until 2012 at Raw 1000, where The Undertaker would return to help Kane fend off Jinder Mahal, Curt Hawkins, Tyler Reks, Camacho and Drew McIntyre. 

Bragging Rights would be a short-lived pay-per-view, as the 2010 event was the final Bragging Rights. It was discontinued and replaced by the returning Vengeance in 2011. Although the 2010 event was the final Bragging Rights event, a similar brand competition theme was used for 2016's Survivor Series, and the annual Survivor Series now revolves around competition for brand supremacy.

Results

14-man interpromotional elimination tag team match

References

External links
Official Bragging Rights website

2010
2010 in Minnesota
Events in Minneapolis
Professional wrestling in Minneapolis
2010 WWE pay-per-view events
October 2010 events in the United States